Masdevallia sumapazensis is a species of orchid in the genus Masdevallia, endemic to the Eastern Cordillera of Colombia in northern South America. It was first described by Pedro Ortiz in 1981. The species Byrsella sumapazensis, described in 2006 by Luer, is a synonym species of Masdevallia.

Etymology 
The genus name Masdevallia is derived from José Masdeval, a physician and botanist in the court of Charles III of Spain.

Description 
The small high elevation orchid is yellow-green with purple spots. The species is considered vulnerable.

Conservation  
It is listed as vulnerable in the Red Book of Colombian plants.

See also 
List of flora and fauna named after the Muisca
Sumapaz Páramo

References

External links 
 
 Illustration of Masdevallia sumapazensis

Sumapazensis
Endemic orchids of Colombia
Flora of the Andes
Sumapazensis